is a Japanese voice actress from Gunma Prefecture who is affiliated with I'm Enterprise. She started her voice acting activities after winning the grand prize at an international voice acting audition in 2016. After a period of training at the Japan Narration Actor Institute, she debuted as a voice actress in 2020. In 2022, she was cast in her first main anime role as Hiyori Minagi in Slow Loop.

Filmography

Anime
2020
Aikatsu on Parade!, Customer

2021
Laid-Back Camp Season 2, Cafe clerk
Fruits Basket, Graduate 
Pretty Boy Detective Club 
Love Live! Superstar!! 
To Your Eternity
The Night Beyond the Tricornered Window

2022
Slow Loop, Hiyori Minagi
Skeleton Knight in Another World, Lauren Laraiya du Luvierte

2023
My Unique Skill Makes Me OP Even at Level 1, Emily Brown
I Shall Survive Using Potions!, Kaoru

References

External links
Agency profile 

Japanese voice actresses
I'm Enterprise voice actors
Voice actresses from Gunma Prefecture
Year of birth missing (living people)
Living people